Mandelate racemase is a bacterial enzyme which catalyzes the interconversion of the enantiomers of mandelate via an enol intermediate. This enzyme catalyses the following chemical reaction

 (S)-mandelate  (R)-mandelate

It is a member of the enolase superfamily of enzymes, along with muconate lactonizing enzyme and enolase.

References

External links 
 

EC 5.1.2